Grass Lawn, also known as the Milner House, was a two-story Antebellum home located in Gulfport, Harrison County, Mississippi.  In 1972, the home was added to the National Register of Historic Places.  In 2005, the home was destroyed during Hurricane Katrina.  A replica of Grass Lawn, Grasslawn II, was built and was designated a Mississippi Landmark in 2010.  The new structure was dedicated in 2012 for use in city events, weddings, receptions, and parties.

History
Grass Lawn was constructed in 1836 as a summer home for Dr. Hiram A. Roberts, a Port Gibson surgeon and owner of sugarcane plantations in Louisiana. The house was located in Gulfport, Mississippi on 235 acres (95.1 hectares) overlooking the Mississippi Sound.  Grass Lawn was unique in that it was of wood-pegged construction with timbers of hand-hewn longleaf pine and walls of bald cypress.  Heart-pine lumber was used as flooring, and  fireplace mantels were composed of either black or white marble.  The 2-story home had 10-foot-wide (3-meter-wide) porches supported by box columns.

Through the years, the property was subdivided, and in 1905, John Kennedy Milner purchased the home.  Milner later became owner of the Coast Coca-Cola Bottling Company in Gulfport.

In 1972, because of its political, historical, and architectural significance, Grass Lawn was placed on the National Register of Historic Places.  In 1973, the Milner Family sold the home to the City of Gulfport.  During the next 32 years, the house was used by the city as a community center for both private and public gatherings.

On August 29, 2005, Grass Lawn was destroyed during Hurricane Katrina.  In the aftermath of the hurricane, government officials committed to construct a period-style replica of Grass Lawn to serve as a visible reminder of historic buildings on the Mississippi Gulf Coast.  The completed structure was dedicated on July 20, 2012, to be used for city functions, and rented out for weddings, receptions, and other events.

References

Houses completed in 1836
Buildings and structures demolished in 2005
Buildings and structures in Gulfport, Mississippi
Demolished buildings and structures in Mississippi
Houses on the National Register of Historic Places in Mississippi
Former National Register of Historic Places in Mississippi
Mississippi Landmarks
Houses in Harrison County, Mississippi
National Register of Historic Places in Harrison County, Mississippi